The Geely Emgrand, originally the Emgrand EC7, is a compact car (C-segment) produced by the Emgrand division of the Chinese automaker Geely. After the discontinuation of the "Emgrand" brand, the Emgrand EC7 was renamed to Geely Emgrand in 2014.



First generation (Emgrand EC7; 2010)

The EC7 was the launch vehicle for the Emgrand brand, the medium to high-end luxury brand of Geely that was launched in July 2009. It was originally launched with multiple Mitsubishi-sourced engines including a 1.5 liter 4G15 inline-four engine and a 1.8 liter 4G18 inline-four engine.

Facelift
The facelifted EC7 used smoked headlights. All other details are the same.

Development
The car was developed from the outset as an export model. Geely engaged a range of mainly global suppliers, including Siemens for the electronic control system, Lear Corporation for seats, and Saint-Gobain for the glass. The production line was equipped with products from Fuji, PDE, and Dürr AG.

Overseas sales
In preparation for its introduction into the Europe a market, the EC7 scored 4 stars in the Euro NCAP tests, the first Chinese-designed and produced car to do so. As of October 2015, it is the best selling Chinese brand sedan in China.

Prices are estimated at £10,000 for the 1.5 model on launch.

Iraq
In Iraq, the Emgrand EC7 alongside the bigger Emgrand EC8 are assembled by the local state-owned company, the SCAI.

Iran
In Iran, the Emgrand EC7 and Emgrand EC7-RV are sold by Geelran Company, Geely's official selling agent.

Namibia
The EC7 was launched in Namibia in 2013 at the same time as South Africa.

Russia
The Emgrand EC7 was made by Derways under CKD on May 23, 2012. A newly redesigned EC7 was introduced to the Russian market in February 2016.

Derways announced a recall of EC7 made from May 23, 2014, to November 21, 2014, due to problems with brake hoses.

South Africa
The EC7 was officially launched in South Africa in 2013. It's sold at R149,000.

Sri Lanka
In Sri Lanka, Emgrand EC7 is sold under the Micro Emgrand brand which is owned by Geely.

Taiwan
The Emgrand EC7 was sold as the Tobe M'way by Yulon Motor in Taiwan from May 2012.

UK
The car was scheduled to be launched into the United Kingdom market in late 2012. Geely set up Geely Auto UK, a jointly-held subsidiary of Manganese Bronze Holdings also owning taxi specialist LTI. Geely Auto UK Ltd will be based in Coventry.

In partnership with Manganese Bronze, Geely started setting up a 40-strong dealer organisation, choosing small family-style garages to sell the cars, described as: "The sort of garages that used to sell Škodas before the company was owned by Volkswagen, and the type of establishment that once might have sold Rovers."

Second generation (2014)

The second generation Geely Emgrand was shown to the public in the 2014 Beijing Auto Show carrying the new Geely Earth emblem. The replacement of the emblem marked the end of the Emgrand premium brand for Geely. The second generation model is based on the same platform as the previous generation and was seen as a facelift for most consumers.

Facelift
The second generation Emgrand sedan received a facelift in 2016 for the 2017 model year. The facelifted Emgrand sedan carried the "ripple grille". The tail lights were also redesigned.

Overseas sales

Belarus
In Belarus, production of the Geely Emgrand 7 commenced in the autumn of 2018 by a Belarus/Chinese joint-venture car manufacturer BelGee.

Russia
Despite the discontinuation of the Emgrand premium brand in the Chinese home market, the Emgrand brand was still sold in Russia. The second-generation Emgrand EC7 was introduced to the Russian market by Derways in February 2016.

Third generation (2018)

The third-generation Emgrand went on sale in May 2018 as a sedan only. Just like the second-generation models, the third-generation model is still based on the same structure that underpins the first and second-generation models and is in fact an extensive facelift in terms of exterior design. The update features a revised front and a completely redesigned rear end.

A minor facelift for the 2019 model year was launched mainly for the then newly launched National VI Emission Standard. The update features slightly revised grille and intake inserts on the exterior, and for the interior, the GKUI infotainment system was added, enabling mobile phone adaption, Amap, online music database, voice control, Himalaya FM radio and vehicle function controls via mobile app.

2021 facelift
A facelift for the 2021 model year called the Geely Emgrand Up was launched in December 2020 alongside the Emgrand GL Up. The update is complete with what Geely calls the 4.0 Family Design language and features a vertically slotted grille.

Fourth generation (SS11; 2021)

News of the fourth generation Emgrand sedan surfaced in May 2021. Different from the previous models, the fourth generation Emgrand is based on a brand new platform and body. The design is inline with the Geely Preface sedan and Geely Xingyue L crossover SUV. The engine of the fourth generation Emgrand comes from a JLC-4G15B 1.5 liter naturally aspirated inline-4 engine developing 114 hp. Fast forward to August 2021, the latest Geely Emgrand was launched in its home country, China. The B-segment sedan sits on the brand's BMA platform and comes with the aforementioned 1.5 litre naturally aspirated engine that's mated to either a five-speed manual or a CVT.

At the Chengdu Motor Show 2021, Geely teased the arrival of the Emgrand L. Essentially the Emgrand sedan seen above, but with the brand's latest design language taken from the Vision Starburst concept.

Notes

References

External links

EC7
Compact cars
Front-wheel-drive vehicles
Hatchbacks
Sedans
Euro NCAP large family cars
Cars introduced in 2009
2010s cars
Cars of China
Production electric cars